These are the official results of the Women's 200 metres event at the 1982 European Championships in Athens, Greece, held at Olympic Stadium "Spiros Louis" on 8 and 9 September 1982.

Medalists

Results

Final
9 September
Wind: 0.9 m/s

Heats
8 September

Heat 1
Wind: 0.4 m/s

Heat 2
Wind: -2.9 m/s

Participation
According to an unofficial count, 16 athletes from 8 countries participated in the event.

 (1)
 (3)
 (2)
 (1)
 (1)
 (2)
 (3)
 (3)

See also
 1978 Women's European Championships 200 metres (Prague)
 1980 Women's Olympic 200 metres (Moscow)
 1983 Women's World Championships 200 metres (Helsinki)
 1984 Women's Olympic 200 metres (Los Angeles)
 1986 Women's European Championships 200 metres (Stuttgart)
 1987 Women's World Championships 200 metres (Rome)
 1988 Women's Olympic 200 metres (Seoul)

References

 Results

200 metres
200 metres at the European Athletics Championships
1982 in women's athletics